Geelong Eastern Cemetery is a cemetery located in the city of Geelong, Victoria in Australia. The cemetery dates back to 1839.

141 Ormond Road, The Eastern Cemetery Gatehouse is listed on the Victorian Heritage Register.

Notable interments
 Thomas Austin, member of the Acclimatisation Society of Victoria
 Percy Ellingsen, Australian Rules footballer
 James Harrison, engineer and politician
 Howard Hitchcock, organised construction of the Great Ocean Road
 Bervin Ellis Purnell, Mayor of Geelong
 Bransby Cooper, Cricketer – Played in the first ever Test Match
 Anne Drysdale, from whom Drysdale, Victoria, is named
 Caroline Elizabeth Newcomb, woman pioneer squatter, partner of Anne Drysdale
 Catherine McDonald née Potaskie, first European born in Tasmania

War graves
The cemetery contains the war graves of 45 Commonwealth service personnel. There are 9 from World War I and 36 from World War II.

References

External links
 
 Geelong Eastern Cemetery – Billion Graves
 Geelong Eastern Public Cemetery Australian cemeteries

1839 establishments in Australia
Cemeteries in Victoria (Australia)
Geelong